Juha-Pekka Ketola (born January 21, 1983) is a Finnish former professional ice hockey centre.

Born in Rauma, Ketola began his playing career at junior level with his hometown team Lukko, during which he was drafted 287th overall by the New York Islanders in the 2001 NHL Entry Draft. Following his draft selection, Ketola sought to gain North American experience and joined the Sherbrooke Castors of the Quebec Major Junior Hockey League for the 2001–02 season. He managed just eight goals in 62 games in his only season in North America before returning to Lukko's junior team the following year.

In 2003, Ketola joined Ässät and went on play 83 regular season games over two seasons, scoring three goals and registering one assist. He departed in 2005 to join Hokki of Mestis for one season before moving to France to play for Division 1 team Bisons de Neuilly-sur-Marne.

Career statistics

Regular season and playoffs

International

References

External links

1983 births
Living people
Ässät players
Bisons de Neuilly-sur-Marne players
Finnish ice hockey centres
Hokki players
New York Islanders draft picks
People from Rauma, Finland
Sherbrooke Castors players
Finnish expatriate ice hockey players in France
Finnish expatriate ice hockey players in Canada
Sportspeople from Satakunta